Palam (phonetically Pālam) is a major residential colony located in South West Delhi. The Indira Gandhi International Airport, formerly known as Palam Airport, the main airport of National Capital Region is situated here. It is one of 70 Vidhan Sabha constituencies of the Delhi National Capital Territory in northern India.

History
Palam is listed in the Ain-i-Akbari as a pargana under Delhi sarkar, producing a revenue of 5,726,787 dams for the imperial treasury and supplying a force of 1000 infantry and 70 cavalry.

Palam is referenced in a sarcastic Persian verse commenting on the weakness of the Mughal Empire in its Late Period: Sultanat-e-Shah-e-Alam, Az Dilli ta Palam, which means "The dominion of Emperor Shah Alam begins from Delhi and ends at Palam." This indicates that Palam existed during the rule of Mughal Empire in India.

Palam and surrounding suburbs of Delhi were sacked, plundered and burned by the Maratha forces led by Baji Rao I, in their attempt to capture Delhi in 1753.

Geography
Palam is situated 20 km southwest of the New Delhi City Centre. It is surrounded by Delhi Cantt, Dwarka and Janakpuri. Palam is part of the "Dwarka Sub-Division" of the South West Delhi District.

Palam is broadly divided into Raj Nagar and Sadh Nagar. 
Raj Nagar is divided into 2 parts: Raj Nagar-1 and Raj Nagar Part-2. Similarly, Sadh Nagar is divided into Sadh Nagar-1 and Sadh Nagar-2.

Ram chowk, Maharaja Agrasen chowk, Pradhan Chowk are the major landmarks of Sadh Nagar. Whereas, Bhagwaan Parshuram Chowk, Dada Chhatri Wala Marg, Standard Sweets Corner, Mamta Bakery, DDA Park and Jhande wala Chowk are the major landmarks of Raj Nagar.

Palam Village is very historical village in Delhi where Palam area is named after. It is also famous for Khap panchayat Palam 360 Khap (Dilli) of Delhi since thousands od years.

Demographics 
According to the 2011 census, the OBC community is the largest single demographic group residing in the Palam area.

The census estimated that the ethnoreligious composition of the area was as follows:

31.9% Other Backwards Castes, 26.3% Muslims, 15.4% Scheduled Castes, 10.8% General category, 9.7% Scheduled Tribes, 4.4% Christian, 0.7% Jain, 0.5% Buddhist, 0.3% Sikh.

Government and politics
Palam lies in the South Delhi Lok Sabha constituency from where Ramesh Bidhuri from BJP is the MP. In Delhi Legislative Assembly Bhavna Gaur from AAP is the MLA from Palam. The complete Palam area consisting of wards Mahavir Enclave (147), Mangla puri (130), Palam (145), Rajnagar (142) and Sadh Nagar (146) comes in the Najafgarh zone of the South Delhi Municipal Corporation.

Climate

Palam features an atypical version of the humid subtropical climate (Köppen Cwa). The warm season lasts from 9 April to 8 July, with an average daily high temperature above . The cold season lasts from 11 December to 11 February with an average daily high temperature below . In early March, the wind direction changes from north-westerly to south-westerly. From April to October the weather is hot. The monsoon arrives at the end of June, along with an increase in humidity. The brief, mild winter starts in late November, peaks in January and heavy fog often occurs.

The average date of the advent of monsoon winds in Palam is 29 June.

Economy

Palam's market is quite famous with over 1,000 shops. Many shops are on the Palam Main Road, Ram Chowk, Syndicate Market, Dada Chattri Wala Marg, Old Mehrauli Road, Shere Punjab Dhaba, Mor Mukut Restaurant, Food Junction, Domino's under Palam-Dwarka Flyover as well as in Mahavir Enclave, Hans Namkeen, Pizza Hut in Mahavir Enclave, Jab We Met, Mukesh Ande Wala, Rajeev Famous Omelette, Badi Dukaan Waale, Patanjali, Da Pizza Corner, Al Nawab Restaurant,   Footland and Swastik Creation, Garg garments, Goyal Traders, Mittal medicos, New Mittal medicos, etc.

Old Mehrauli road contains many eateries like Mahadeva Sweets and Snacks, Standard Sweets, etc. There are grocery stores such as Big Mart. All daily essentials are available in the market.

Culture
Palam's culture is diverse and includes many temples, the biggest and oldest of which is Dada Dev Mandir, worshiped as the gram devta (village god) of the 12 villages of Palam, Shahbad, Bagdola, Nasirpur, Bindapur, Dabri, Asalatpur, Untkala, Matiala, Baprola, Poothkala and Nangalraya. Established in Vikram Samvant 781 or 838 AD, after a dream made Saints Dada Dev and Jaidev transport a stone north from Tonk in Rajasthan, the temple complex is huge and is spread over eight acres. Devotees believe in seeking the blessings of Dada Dev before starting any new venture. All the year around pilgrims come to the temple to offer prayers and to seek fulfillment of their wishes. Many festivals are celebrated here in great joy, particularly Janmastmi (Krishnastmi).

The Palam Mosque is the only surviving building of Babur's reign in Delhi. It is recognized for its Sanskrit inscription and for having been visited by Ibn Battuta. According to an inscription in mixed Arabic and Persian prose on the northern arch of its central compartment, it was built by one Ghazanfar in 935 AH (1528–29).

Palam also boasts a Toilet Museum and an Air Force Museum.

Transport

Palam has a well-established transportation infrastructure. It is well connected to other parts of Delhi by Roads. Palam is connected to other States by air, rail and road.

Road
Buses are primarily operated by the DTC and DIMTS; although a privately operated network of chartered buses connects Palam to corporate offices nearby and in the National Capital Territory.

Delhi Metro
Palam Metro Station is served by Magenta Line of Delhi Metro that directly connects it to Janakpuri and Botanical Garden. Palam's underground Metro station near the Palam Police Station is in its third building phase. It was opened for public on 29 May 2018

Rail Network

Palam railway station has connections to Rewari, Delhi Cantonment and New Delhi.
Porbandar, Motihari & Delhi Sarai Rohilla trains pass through Palam Railway Station.

Airways
Indira Gandhi International Airport, formerly known as Palam Airport, is situated in Palam.

Health care
Palam's public health services network includes Palam Colony D-66 Central Government Health Scheme (CGHS) dispensary, a Primary Health Centre (PHC).

References

External links
 
 
 http://trak.in/tags/business/2007/06/22/what-is-the-average-earnings-of-a-non-resident-indian/

Neighbourhoods in Delhi
Cities and towns in South West Delhi district